Brachychiton multicaulis is a tree of the genus Brachychiton found in northern Australia. It was described in 1988.

Notes

References

multicaulis
Malvales of Australia
Trees of Australia
Ornamental trees
Drought-tolerant trees
Plants described in 1988